This is a list of transactions that have taken place during the off-season and the 2023 WNBA season.

Front office movements

Head coach changes
Off-season

Player movement
Free Agency negotiation began on January 21, 2023. Free Agents were allowed to officially sign with their teams on February 1, 2023.

Trades

Free agency

Waived

Waiver Claims

Contract Suspensions

Training camp cuts
All players listed did not make the final roster.

Draft

First round

Second round

Third round

References

Transactions